Thomas Ritchey (January 19, 1801 – March 9, 1863) was an American politician who served two non-consecutive terms as a U.S. Representative from Ohio in the mid-19th century.

Biography 
Born in Bedford County, Pennsylvania, Ritchey moved to Somerset, Ohio.
He attended the common schools.
He engaged in agricultural pursuits.
Treasurer of Perry County in 1835, 1837, and 1839.

Congress 
Ritchey was elected as a Democrat to the Thirtieth Congress (March 4, 1847 – March 3, 1849).

Ritchey was elected to the Thirty-third Congress (March 4, 1853 – March 3, 1855).

Later career and death 
He engaged in agricultural pursuits near Somerset, Ohio, until his death on March 9, 1863.
He was interred in the Zion Methodist Episcopal Cemetery, Madison Township, Perry County, Ohio.

Sources

1801 births
1863 deaths
People from Bedford County, Pennsylvania
People from Somerset, Ohio
19th-century American politicians
Democratic Party members of the United States House of Representatives from Ohio